Hans Behlendorff (13 August 1889 – 16 March 1961) was a German general during World War II. He was also a recipient of the Knight's Cross of the Iron Cross of Nazi Germany.

Awards and decorations

 Knight's Cross of the Iron Cross on 11 October 1941 as Generalleutnant and commander of 34. Infanterie-Division

References

Citations

Bibliography

1889 births
1961 deaths
German Army generals of World War II
Generals of Artillery (Wehrmacht)
German Army personnel of World War I
People from East Prussia
People from Olsztyn
Prussian Army personnel
Recipients of the clasp to the Iron Cross, 1st class
Recipients of the Knight's Cross of the Iron Cross
Reichswehr personnel